Vidja is a locality situated in Huddinge Municipality, Stockholm County, Sweden with 682 inhabitants in 2010.

References 

Populated places in Huddinge Municipality